George Bartley is an American ophthalmologist and editor-in-chief of Ophthalmology, a major journal in that field. He also is the Louis and Evelyn Krueger Professor of Ophthalmology at the Mayo Clinic in Rochester, Minnesota. The American Academy of Ophthalmology awarded George Bartley the 2020 Laureate Recognition Award for exceptional scientific and leadership contributions to ophthalmology.

Education
Dr. Bartley earned a Bachelor of Arts from Miami University in 1978 and a Doctor of Medicine degree from the Ohio State University College of Medicine in 1981. After internship at Riverside Methodist Hospital in Columbus, Ohio, he conducted residency training in ophthalmology at the Mayo Clinic and subspecialty training in ophthalmic plastic and orbital surgery at Wright State University under Dr. John D. Bullock, a cataract surgeon and ophthalmic plastic surgeon.

Medical career
Bartley joined the Department of Ophthalmology at Mayo Clinic in 1986 and was appointed Department Chair in 1992. He served in that role until 2001 when he was elected to the Mayo Clinic Board of Governors. The following year, Bartley was appointed chief executive officer of Mayo's operations in Florida. He resumed his surgical practice in Rochester in 2009 while serving as Chair of the Doctors Mayo Society and Medical Director for Alumni Philanthropy.

Editorial roles
Bartley has served as the editor-in-chief of Ophthalmic Plastic and Reconstructive Surgery, Senior Associate Editor of the American Journal of Ophthalmology, and as an editorial board member of Archives of Ophthalmology. He was editor-in-chief of the journal Ophthalmology from 2012 to 2017.

References

External links
https://finance.yahoo.com/news/george-b-bartley-m-d-174500485.html
http://www.aaojournal.org/content/ed_board_bios
http://www.mayoclinic.org/biographies/bartley-george-b-m-d/bio-20054363
http://www.aaojournal.org/content/ed_board
http://ophthalmologytimes.modernmedicine.com/ophthalmologytimes/content/george-bartley-become-ophthalmology-editor-january?page=full

Miami University alumni
Ohio State University College of Medicine alumni
LGBT physicians
American ophthalmologists